Terebratulids are one of only three living orders of articulate brachiopods, the others being the Rhynchonellida and the Thecideida. Craniida and Lingulida include living brachiopods, but are inarticulates. The name, Terebratula, may be derived from the Latin "terebra", meaning "hole-borer". The perceived resemblance of terebratulid shells to ancient Roman oil lamps gave the brachiopods their common name "lamp shell".

Terebratulids typically have biconvex shells that are usually ovoid to circular in outline. They can be either smooth or have radial ribbing. The lophophore support is loop shaped in contrast to the spiralia of similar looking spiriferids. Terebratulids are also distinguished by a very short hinge line, and the shell is punctate in microstructure. There is a circular pedicle opening, or foramen, located in the beak.

Terebratulids may have evolved from Atrypids during the early or Middle Silurian.  Early genera were almost circular to elongate-oval, with smooth or finely costate shells. During the Cretaceous and Tertiary periods, many shells became coarsely plicate.

Classification
 Suborder Terebratellidina
 Superfamily Kraussinoidea
 Superfamily Laqueoidea
 Superfamily Megathyridoidea
 Superfamily Platidioidea
 Superfamily Terebratelloidea
 Family Dallinidae
 Family Ecnomiosidae
 Family Terebratellidae
 Family Thaumatosiidae
 Superfamily Zeillerioidea
 Superfamily Bouchardioidea
 Superfamily Gwynioidea
 Superfamily Kingenoidea
 Superfamily Incertae sedis
 Family Tythothyrididae
 Suborder Terebratulidina
 Superfamily Cancellothyroidea
 Family Cancellothyrididae
 Family Chlidonophoridae
 Family Cnismatocentridae
 Superfamily Dyscoloidea
 Superfamily Terebratuloidea
 Family Gryphidae
 Family Tichosidae
 Family Terebratulidae

Extinct Superfamilies
 Superfamily Dielasmatoidea †
 Superfamily Cryptonelloidea †
 Superfamily Loboidothyridoidea †
 Superfamily Stryingocephaloidea †

Gallery

References

 
Brachiopod orders
Silurian first appearances